David Tom is an American actor, most famous for portraying Billy Abbott on the CBS soap opera The Young and the Restless from 1999 to 2002, and again in 2014.

Career
In 1993, Tom was nominated for two Young Artist Awards for his roles in Stepfather III and Stay Tuned. In 1994, he was again nominated for "Outstanding Youth Ensemble in a Motion Picture" for Swing Kids, alongside co-stars Robert Sean Leonard, Christian Bale and Frank Whaley.

He portrayed Billy Abbott on the CBS soap opera, The Young and the Restless, from 1999 to 2002. Tom received two Daytime Emmy nominations for "Outstanding Younger Actor" in 2000 and 2001, winning in the former year. He also won a Soap Opera Digest Award for "Outstanding Male Newcomer" in 2000 and was consecutively nominated in 2001 for "Outstanding Younger Lead Actor". It was announced in November 2013 that Tom would be reprising the role of Billy, taking over the role from Billy Miller, who had portrayed the character since 2008. Tom returned as Billy on Y&R in February 2014. Four months later, Tom was fired from the show and the role of Billy was recast yet again with primetime television actor Burgess Jenkins.

In 2004, Tom portrayed Paul Cramer (the half-brother of Kelly Cramer, portrayed by his sister, Heather) on the ABC soap opera, One Life to Live, a role he played from March of that year to October 2004. His character was crucial to a year-long baby-switch storyline on One Life to Live and its sister series, All My Children. He played Whitey, Tobey Maguire's adversary in the Reese Witherspoon/Tobey Maguire movie Pleasantville in 1998. He also had a small role in the made-for-TV movie The '60s in 1999, and a recurring role on The CW television network in its series Veronica Mars in 2006.

Personal life
Tom was born in Hinsdale, Illinois to Charles and Marie Tom.  He has a twin sister, Nicholle Tom who is also an actress. He and Nicholle guest-starred together playing the roles of siblings in an episode of Criminal Minds in 2008. Heather Tom, his older sister who is a regular on The Bold and The Beautiful portraying Katie Logan, appeared on The Young and the Restless as well as Victoria Newman. The two almost never appeared together in the same scene; after other actors assumed the roles their characters were married for a time.

David Tom's musical background includes formerly being the lead singer of the indie rock band Eudora.

Filmography

Film

Television

References

3. from the DVD liner notes for Walking Thunder (1994) as Jacob McKay

External links

1978 births
Living people
People from Hinsdale, Illinois
American male film actors
American male soap opera actors
Daytime Emmy Award winners
Daytime Emmy Award for Outstanding Younger Actor in a Drama Series winners
Male actors from Illinois
American male child actors
American male television actors
American twins
20th-century American male actors
21st-century American male actors